Julio Hirsch (born 14 July 1956), known professionally as Julio Chávez, is an Argentine film, theatre and television actor.

He was born in Buenos Aires, and received his first film role in 1973. Since 1976, he has had leading roles in Argentine cinema and, more recently, in Argentine television.

Filmography

Television

Awards
Wins
 Argentine Film Critics Association Awards: Silver Condor, Best Actor, for El Otro; 2008, Best Actor, for El Custodio; 2007, Best Actor, for A Red Bear; 2003.
 Lleida Latin-American Film Festival: Best Actor, for A Red Bear; 2003.
 Bogota Film Festival: Honorable Mention, Best Actor, for El Custodio; 2006.
 Berlin International Film Festival: Silver Bear, Best Actor, for El Otro; 2007.
 Association of Latin Entertainment Critics Awards: Best Actor, for El Custodio; 2008.
 Tato award as best lead actor in drama for Farsantes, 2013
 2013 Martín Fierro Awards: best actor of daily drama (for Farsantes)

Nominations
 Argentine Film Critics Association Awards: Silver Condor, Best Actor, for El Visitante; (2000).
 Argentine Film Critics Association Awards: Silver Condor, Best Actor, for Extraño; (2005).

References

External links
 
 

1956 births
Argentine male television actors
Argentine male film actors
Living people
Male actors from Buenos Aires
Argentine Jews
Jewish Argentine male actors
Silver Bear for Best Actor winners
20th-century Argentine male actors
21st-century Argentine male actors